Fritz Schuler (April 12, 1885 – July 30, 1955) was a German politician of the Christian Democratic Union (CDU) and former member of the German Bundestag.

Life 
In 1946 he became a member of the Württemberg State Church Congress in Stuttgart. On 17 November 1946 he was elected to the Consultative State Assembly and on 18 May 1947 to the first state parliament of the state of Württemberg-Hohenzollern. He was a member of the German Bundestag from the first Bundestag election in 1949 until his death. In 1949, as in 1953, he represented the electoral district of Calw as a delegate sent out in direct election.

Literature

References

1885 births
1955 deaths
Members of the Bundestag for Baden-Württemberg
Members of the Bundestag 1953–1957
Members of the Bundestag 1949–1953
Members of the Bundestag for the Christian Democratic Union of Germany
Members of the Landtag of Württemberg
Officers Crosses of the Order of Merit of the Federal Republic of Germany